Deryck Lance Murray (born 20 May 1943) is a former West Indies cricketer. A wicketkeeper and right-handed batsman, Murray kept wicket to the West Indian fast bowling attacks of the 1970s (including Andy Roberts, Michael Holding, Joel Garner and Colin Croft); his glovework effected 189 Test dismissals and greatly enhanced the potency of the bowling attack.

Murray captained Trinidad and Tobago 1976–1981, and was vice-captain of the sides which won the 1975 World Cup and the 1979 World Cup. He deputised for Clive Lloyd as West Indies captain in one Test match in 1979.

Early and personal life
Murray was born in Port of Spain, Trinidad and Tobago, and educated at Queen's Royal College; he first played for Trinidad and Tobago national cricket team while still at school. He went on to study at the University of Nottingham and Jesus College, Cambridge, earning his Cambridge blue and captaining Cambridge University Cricket Club in 1966. Murray married Maureen in 1967; they have two sons.

Cricket career
In his career, Murray played as a wicketkeeper for the national Trinidad and Tobago team as well as playing 62 Tests for the West Indies. He was first selected for the West Indies as a 20-year-old, under the captaincy of Frank Worrell; in his maiden series in 1963 he effected a record 24 dismissals. Though he never scored a Test century, Murray's right-handed batting in the middle order could be effective. During his highest Test score of 91, against India in 1975, he shared a partnership worth 250 runs with Clive Lloyd (who scored 242 not out).

Probably Murray's most famous performance came in a match in the 1975 Cricket World Cup against Pakistan when he inspired the West Indies to an unlikely and important one-wicket victory with his highest one-day international score of 61 not out, sharing in an unbroken last-wicket stand of 64 with Andy Roberts. The West Indies went onto win the final, Murray clinching victory with the run out of Jeff Thomson. Murrary also played in the West Indies victory in the final of the second world cup in 1979.

Murray captained the West Indies in one Test against Australia in 1979, and in two one-day internationals.

Murray played in the English County Championship for Nottinghamshire and Warwickshire.

Later career
Murray served as a diplomat in the Foreign Service of Trinidad and Tobago 1978–1989, becoming a representative to the United Nations in New York, where he served as Vice-Chairman of the Fifth Committee and Chairman of the Committee for Programme & Coordination. He also worked in the financial services industry. Murray officiated as match referee for three One Day Internationals in 1992. He has also served as President of the Trinidad and Tobago Cricket Board. Murray is also Chairman of the Trinidad and Tobago Transparency Institute, the local branch of the anti-corruption organisation Transparency International.

In September 2019 he was appointed Trinidad and Tobago's High Commissioner to Jamaica.

References

External links

WICB profile (archived 2007)

Trinidad and Tobago cricketers
West Indies One Day International cricketers
West Indies Test cricketers
West Indies Test cricket captains
Cricketers from Port of Spain
World Series Cricket players
North Trinidad cricketers
Cricketers at the 1975 Cricket World Cup
Cricketers at the 1979 Cricket World Cup
1943 births
Living people
Alumni of Jesus College, Cambridge
Cambridge University cricketers
Warwickshire cricketers
Nottinghamshire cricketers
International Cavaliers cricketers
Marylebone Cricket Club cricketers
Alumni of Queen's Royal College, Trinidad
A. E. R. Gilligan's XI cricketers
Wicket-keepers
High Commissioners of Trinidad and Tobago to Jamaica